Axel Kárason (born February 11, 1983) is an Icelandic basketball player, who plays for Tindastóll in the Icelandic Úrvalsdeild karla, and a former member of the Icelandic national team, where he participated at the EuroBasket 2015.

Playing career
Axel spent the early part of his career with Tindastóll and Skallagrímur. He was a key player on the Skallagrímur team that went to the 2006 Úrvalsdeild finals where it lost to Njarðvík.
In 2015, Axel signed with Svendborg Rabbits, after five seasons with Værløse Basket, and remained there until 2017 when he moved back to the Icelandic Úrvalsdeild karla and signed with his hometown team, Tindastóll.

On January 13, 2018, he helped Tindastóll to its first major title when they beat KR in Icelandic Basketball Cup finals.

In September 2018, it was reported that Axel would not play during the 2018–2019 season. In an interview with Vísir.is, he stated that his departure from Tindastóll was due to personal reasons and denied rumors of his alleged unhappiness with the club signing Brynjar Þór Björnsson during the off-season.

In January 2019, Axel signed with Tindastóll for the rest of the season.

In 2022, he went to the Úrvalsdeild finals for the fourth time in his career, 21 years after his first trip in 2001.

National team
Axel was a member of the Icelandic national basketball team from 2006 to 2017, appearing in 57 games. He was a member of Iceland's squad at EuroBasket 2015.

Personal life
Kári is the son of former Icelandic national team members Katrín Axelsdóttir and Kári Marísson. He is the brother of former basketball players Arnar Snær Kárason and María Káradóttir and half-brother of former Icelandic Women's Basketball Player of the Year Kristín Björk Jónsdóttir. Outside of basketball, Kári is a licensed veterinarian.

References

External
2001-2007 statistics
KKÍ.is player profile

1983 births
Living people
Axel Karason
Axel Karason
Axel Karason
Axel Karason
Axel Karason
Small forwards
Axel Karason
Axel Karason